Patrycja Balcerzak (born 1 January 1994) is a Polish professional footballer who plays as a midfielder for Spanish club Sporting de Huelva and the Poland women's national team.

References

External links
 Player Polish domestic and international stats at PZPN 
 

1994 births
Living people
Place of birth missing (living people)
Polish women's footballers
Women's association football midfielders
Medyk Konin players
Górnik Łęczna (women) players
SC Sand players
Sporting de Huelva players
Frauen-Bundesliga players
Poland women's international footballers
Polish expatriate footballers
Polish expatriate sportspeople in Germany
Expatriate women's footballers in Germany
Polish expatriate sportspeople in Spain
Expatriate women's footballers in Spain